Mycolactone is a polyketide-derived macrolide produced and secreted by a group of very closely related pathogenic Mycobacteria species that have been assigned a variety of names including, M. ulcerans, M. liflandii (an unofficial designation), M. pseudoshottsii, and some strains of M. marinum. These mycobacteria are collectively referred to as mycolactone-producing mycobacteria or MPM.

In humans, mycolactone is the toxin responsible for Buruli ulcers, doing so by damaging tissues and inhibiting the immune response.


Variants
Five distinct, naturally occurring mycolactone structural variants have been described so far:
 Mycolactone A/B (M. ulcerans from Africa, Malaysia, Japan
 Mycolactone C (M. ulcerans from Australia)
 Mycolactone D (M. ulcerans from China)
 Mycolactone E (M. liflandii from Sub-Saharan Africa)
 Mycolactone F (M. pseudoshottsii and M. marinum from around the world)

Biosynthesis 
Mycolactone consists of a 12-membered macrolide core with an ester-linked polyketide chain. Three plasmid-encoded polyketide synthase (PKS) enzymes are responsible for its production: MLSA 1 and MLSA 2 which generate the core, and MLSB is responsible for the synthesis of the polyketide chain. As shown in Figure 1, MLSB (1.2 MDa) contains seven consecutive extension modules and MLSA 1 (1.8 MDa) consists of eight. The remaining PKS enzyme, MLSA 2, contains the ninth module of MLSA. The C-terminal domains of both MLSA2 and MLSB includes a thioesterase (TE) that was thought to catalyze the formation of the mycolactone core but appears inactive. Each module consists of either malonyl-CoA or methylmalonyl-CoA Acyltransferase (AT) that allows for chain extension, a ketosynthase (KS), which catalyzes chain elongation, and an Acyl carrier protein (ACP) where the growing polyketide chain is attached. Modules may also consist of any of the following modifying domains: a dehydratase (DH), an enoyl reductase (ER) and one of two types of ketoreductase (KR) domains. Type A and B KRs refer to the two directions of ketoreduction that are correlated with specific amino acids in the active site. Four of the DH domains are predicted to be inactive based on a point mutation found in the active site sequence.

Figure 1. Domain Organization of Mycolactone.

References 

Polyketide antibiotics
Macrolides
Polyenes